Kadhalagi is a 2010 Tamil language coming of age film directed and produced by K. R. Vishwaa. The film stars newcomers Krishnakumar Balasubramanian, Srushti Dange, Amrita Chhabria, Nadhim Khan, Roshan Nawaz, and Nakshatra, while Prakash Raj and newcomer Vijay Gopal play supporting roles. The film had musical score by A. R. Reihana, cinematography by Ravi Shankar, and editing by B. Manoharan. The film released on 28 May 2010.

Plot
A group of four youngsters get on a train. They are then scolded by a quick-tempered stranger named AK (Prakash Raj). He tells the friends that today's young people are immature and good-for-nothing. The friends are about to prove him wrong.

Nandhini Velu Nachiyar (Srushti Dange), Reshmi Kaur (Amrita Chhabria), Mahesh Muthusamy (Nadhim Khan), Mohammed Aslam (Roshan Nawaz), and Angelina Kristy (Nakshatra) were visual communication students and best friends. After the graduation, they had to split up and to go in different directions. Then they met the magician Thyagu (Krishnakumar Balasubramanian), and everything changed. Thyagu and Nandhini were childhood friends and were in love with each other. However, both were from different castes. Nandhini's brother-in-law Raja Rajasekharan (Vijay Gopal) was a despicable caste fanatic and an influential person. He had hatred towards every caste other than his and wanted his community people to get a high post in the society. Thereafter, the six friends formed a group named "Mantra", performing dance, magic, or songs for advertisement companies. When Raja was made aware of Nandhini's love, he killed her and swept this issue under the rug. The five friends protested to grant justice for Nandhini's death, but the police force stopped the protest and beat up the friends. The five then started a TV show in which they exposed the truth behind Nandhini's death.

When the four friends reach their destination, AK is shocked to see Thyagu and Nandhini together. He later reveals that he is actually a CBI officer who was in charge of Raja's case and then forces the friends to tell him what happened. The friends reveal that Nandhini's death was a sham and they used a fake body to make it look like Nandhini. Also, Raja committed suicide when the police tried to arrest him for a murder he did not commit. While AK is initially unhappy at first, he praises the youngsters for their braveness and hushes up the case, revealing his real name as Ananthakrishnan. He then departs as the six friends rejoice in happiness.

Cast

Krishnakumar Balasubramanian as Thyagu
Srushti Dange as Nandhini Velu Nachiyar
Amrita Chhabria as Reshmi Kaur
Nadhim Khan as Mahesh Muthusamy
Roshan Nawaz as Mohammed Aslam
Nakshatra as Angelina Kristy
Prakash Raj as Ananthakrishnan (AK)
Vijay Gopal as Raja Rajasekharan
George Maryan as Sankaran
Kashish as Kashish Kapoor
Santhesh as Sivaprabhu
Jayashree as Mythili
Payisha

Production
"Wide angle" Ravi Shankar was hired as cinematographer, A. R. Rahman's sister A. R. Reihana as music director and S. Thaman took care of the background score. The film director K. R. Viswaa said, "the society is not the same as it was a decade ago. Things have changed a lot. People's view on romance, friendship and the need of shape their career has changed. Kadhalagi is the story of a group of youngsters who struggles for friends and friends who struggle for lovers".

Soundtrack

The soundtrack was composed by A. R. Reihana and background score by S. Thaman. The soundtrack, released on the 14 April 2010 (Tamil New Year). The audio was launched at the Film chambers in Chennai, alongside politician M. K. Alagiri, Vairamuthu, R. K. Selvamani, V. C. Guhanathan, Sivasakthi Pandian, A. R. Reihana and others.

Reception

A critic stated, "the album is youthful and peppy. The singers do justice to the fresh music of A. R. Reihana and the wonderful lyrics of Vairamuthu. Only thing is you must listen to the songs in this album with an open mind".

Reception
Behindwoods.com wrote, "The script is the hero of Kadhalagi with no single character being given extra emphasis, all being equal contributors to the proceedings" and rated it 2.5 out of 5 stars. A critic said, "Every character has complete importance in this film as the suspenseful factors are unravelled only during the point of climax. For sure, you will appreciate K. R. Vishwa for his extraordinary skill for sharp, elegant screenplay".

References

2010 films
2010s Tamil-language films
Indian coming-of-age films
Indian thriller films
2010s coming-of-age films
Films scored by A. R. Reihana
2010 thriller films